The 1922–23 Lancashire Cup was the fifteenth staging of this regional rugby league competition. The trophy was won again by Wigan who beat local rivals Leigh in the final at The Willows, Salford, by a score of 20–2. The attendance at the final was 15,000 and receipts £1,200 (based on increases in average earnings, this would be approximately £232,200 in 2018).

Background 
The number of teams entering this year's competition was reduced by one to 13. Wigan Highfield continued to participate, but now as full league members after joining the league. Askam who had played in the previous two tournaments were not invited to take part this year and no other junior/amateur club was invited to take part. With 13 teams, 3 teams were given byes in the first round.

Competition and results

Round 1  
Involved  5 matches (with three byes) and 13 clubs

Round 2 – quarterfinals

Round 3 – semifinals

Final

Teams and scorers 

Scoring - Try = three (3) points - Goal = two (2) points - Drop goal = two (2) points

The road to success

See also 
1922–23 Northern Rugby Football League season

Notes  
 1 This was also the first game in the competition to be played at Tunstall Lane
 2 The Willows was the home ground of Salford w

References

RFL Lancashire Cup
Lancashire Cup